KMGI may refer to:

 KMGI (FM), a radio station (102.5 FM) licensed to Pocatello, Idaho, United States
 KMGi Group, a holding company for Internet technology related firms